Founded in 1985 by the Events Industry Council (formerly known as the Convention Industry Council), Certified Meeting Professional (CMP) is a certification for event professionals. In order to acquire a CMP certification, an individual must complete the CMP application to demonstrate their eligibility and then successfully pass a written exam covering meeting management. As of May 2018, more than 11,000 meeting professionals in over 55 countries around the world have earned the CMP certification.

Eligibility
Applying for the CMP certification program is a two-step process. First, applicants must apply to be an Events Industry Council Member, then they must pass a written exam about meeting management.

References

Event management